Tim Rucks (December 21, 1960 – March 10, 2015) was an American football player and coach. He served as the head football coach at North Park University in Chicago, Illinois from 1990 to 1994 and Carthage College in Kenosha, Wisconsin from 1995 to 2012, compiling a career college football coaching record of 104–112–4.

Early life an playing career
Rucks was born on December 21, 1960 in Waukegan, Illinois and graduated from Waukegan West High School in 1979. Rucks played college football at Carthage College in Kenosha, Wisconsin, under head coach Art Keller. A first-team College Conference of Illinois and Wisconsin (CCIW), player in his senior year, Rucks graduated in 1983.

Rucks was drafted by the Denver Gold in the 14th round of the inaugural United States Football League Draft in 1983, right ahead of future Pro Football Hall of Fame quarterback Jim Kelly and punter Sean Landeta. However, he decided to forego the USFL, instead signing a free agent contract with the National Football League's New York Jets on May 5 of that year. Only three months later, Rucks was released by the Jets on August 12.

In 1984, Rucks played for the Racine Gladiators, being named to the all-league and all minor-league teams, and in 1985 for the Chicago Chargers. Inducted into the American Football Association Semi-Pro Hall of Fame in 2002, Rucks later served on the Gladiators' (now known as the Racine Raiders) Board of Directors.

Coaching career

High school
Rucks was an assistant coach from 1986 to 1988 at Niles North High School in Skokie, Illinois.

North Park
Rucks was the head football coach at North Park University in Chicago. Having started as an assistant coach in 1989, Rucks was promoted to head coach in 1990, becoming the NCAA's youngest head football coach at 29. Ruck served as head coach for five seasons, until 1994, compiling a record of 9–33–3.

Carthage
After North Park, Rucks became the head football coach at his alma mater, Carthage. Before Rucks took over, the Red Men had not had a single winning season in their previous 13 years. Rucks quickly turned the team's fortunes around, accomplishing winning records in three of their first four seasons. In 2004, Rucks led the Red Men to their first Division III football playoff in 2004, advancing all the way to the quarterfinals. For that he was named the Coach of the Year for the CCIW and the Division III North Region. In 2009, Rucks was named Wisconsin Private College Football Coach of the Year. Rucks stepped down following the 2012 season.  His coaching record at Carthage was 95–79–1.

Later life and death
After retiring as the coach, Rucks remained with Carthage as an assistant athletic director and academic advisor. In 2014, Rucks was inducted into the Wisconsin Football Coaches Association Hall of Fame.

On March 10, 2015, Rucks was found unconscious in his car, which had been in a one-car accident in Kenosha. Emergency crews were unable to resuscitate him. His death was ruled a heart attack.

Head coaching record

References

External links
 

1960 births
2015 deaths
American football offensive tackles
Carthage Firebirds football coaches
Carthage Firebirds football players
New York Jets players
North Park Vikings football coaches
High school football coaches in Illinois
Road incident deaths in Wisconsin
Sportspeople from Waukegan, Illinois
Coaches of American football from Illinois
Players of American football from Illinois